This article contains records and statistics for the Melbourne Storm Rugby League Club who have played in the Australian National Rugby League competition since 1998. Statistical information on this page is for NRL games only and does not take into account games against non NRL teams e.g. World Club Challenge games.

This article is current as the end of the 2022 NRL season.

Sources of information: Rugby League Project  and Rugby League Tables

Melbourne Storm Win–loss record

Club honours

NRL Premierships

NRL Runners Up

NRL Minor Premierships

NRL Under-20s Premierships

World Club Challenge Titles

Finals Appearances
1998, 1999, 2000, 2003, 2004, 2005, 2006, 2007, 2008, 2009, 2011, 2012, 2013, 2014, 2015, 2016, 2017, 2018, 2019, 2020, 2021, 2022

Club Records

Winning Games

Top 10 Biggest Wins

Top 10 Highest Scores

Most Consecutive Wins
19, Round 4 (2 April 2021) - Round 23 (19 August 2021)

Biggest Comeback

Recovered from a 22-point deficit.
Trailed Cronulla-Sutherland Sharks 22-0 after 32 minutes to win 36–32 at Shark Park (16 March 2003).

Losing Games

Top 10 Biggest Losses

Top 10 Highest Scores Conceded

Most Consecutive Losses
6, Round 7 (27 April 2002) - Round 13 (8 June 2002)

Worst Collapse
Surrendered an 18-point lead.
Led Canberra Raiders 18-0 after 29 minutes to lose 22–18 at Melbourne Rectangular Stadium (17 August 2019).

Individual Records

Games for club
 NRL Games only
 Players that have played 150+ games for the club

Try Scoring Records

Top 10 Most Tries For Club

Most Tries In A Match

Most Tries In A Season
Current Record in Bold

Points Scoring Records

Top 10 Most Points For Club

Most Points In A Season
Current Record in Bold

Top 10 Most Points In a Game

Most Goals In A Game
11, Matt Orford - July 2, 2004 vs Penrith Panthers at Olympic Park

Age Records

Oldest Player Fielded
37 years and 129 days, Cameron Smith - October 25, 2020 vs Penrith Panthers at Stadium Australia

Youngest Player Fielded
17 years and 347 days, Israel Folau - March 16, 2007 vs Wests Tigers at Olympic Park

Discipline

Players sent off

Most sin bins - career
 5 — Cameron Munster - 2017 R20, 2017 QF, 2018 R23, 2018 GF (twice)

Longest suspensions

Honour Roll

Captains
This is the complete list of all players that have captained the Melbourne Storm Rugby League club in an NRL game since 1998. Order is dictated by the year and round in which each player first captained the team. Between 2006 and 2007 the club had a rotating captains policy, so there were a large number of players listed as captain during this time. Cameron Smith, the club's longest serving captain, captained his first game during this period (Round 3 2006) even though he did not become the permanent Captain until Round 18 in 2007, this makes him the clubs 11th Captain. Following the retirement of Smith, the club announced that they would use co-captains instead of a single captain during the 2021 and 2022 seasons. Since February 2023, the incumbent captain is Christian Welch.

Source:

Coaches

NRL

NRL Under-20s

Chair

CEOs

Life Members 
Starting in 2005, Melbourne Storm has recognised significant figures in the history of the club, by awarding them life membership.

Individual Competition Honours

NRL

NRL Hall of Fame
Inducted for their contribution to the rugby league in Australia and New Zealand.
2008 – Glenn Lazarus (95th Inductee)

Clive Churchill Medal
Awarded to NRL Grand Final Player of the Match
1999 – Brett Kimmorley
2007 – Greg Inglis
2009 – Billy Slater
2012 – Cooper Cronk
2017 – Billy Slater
2020 – Ryan Papenhuyzen

Dally M Medal
Awarded to NRL Season Player of the Year
2006 – Cameron Smith
2011 – Billy Slater
2013 – Cooper Cronk
2016 – Cooper Cronk
2017 – Cameron Smith

Preston Campbell Medal
Awarded to NRL All-Stars Player of the Match
2020 – Brandon Smith

State of Origin

Wally Lewis Medal
Awarded to State of Origin series Player of the Year
2007 – Cameron Smith
2009 – Greg Inglis
2010 – Billy Slater
2011 – Cameron Smith
2013 – Cameron Smith
2016 – Cameron Smith
2018 – Billy Slater
2020 – Cameron Munster

Ron McAuliffe Medal
Awarded to Queensland State of Origin Player of the Year
2005 – Cameron Smith
2007 – Cameron Smith
2009 – Greg Inglis
2013 – Cameron Smith
2015 – Cameron Smith

Brad Fittler Medal
Awarded to New South Wales State of Origin Player of the Year
2005 – Matt King
2014 – Ryan Hoffman

State of Origin Man of the Match
Awarded at the end of each State of Origin game.
1998 (Game 2) – Rodney Howe
2004 (Game 2) – Billy Slater
2007 (Game 1) – Cameron Smith
2008 (Game 2) – Greg Inglis
2008 (Game 3) – Israel Folau 
2010 (Game 3) – Billy Slater 
2011 (Game 1) – Cameron Smith 
2011 (Game 3) – Cameron Smith 
2013 (Game 2) – Cameron Smith 
2015 (Game 1) – Cameron Smith 
2016 (Game 2) – Cameron Smith 
2017 (Game 3) – Cameron Smith 
2018 (Game 3) – Billy Slater
2020 (Game 3) – Cameron Munster
2022 (Game 1) – Cameron Munster

International

Golden Boot Award
Awarded to World's Best Rugby League Player of the Year
2007 – Cameron Smith
2008 – Billy Slater
2009 – Greg Inglis
2016 – Cooper Cronk
2017 – Cameron Smith

Rugby League International Federation Player of the Year
Awarded to World's Best Rugby League Player of the Year
2008 – Billy Slater
2011 – Billy Slater
2012 – Cameron Smith

World Club Challenge Medal
Awarded to World Club Challenge Player of the Match
2000 – Brett Kimmorley
2010 – Cameron Smith
2013 – Cooper Cronk
2018 – Nelson Asofa-Solomona

NRL Nines Team of the Tournament
2016 – Tohu Harris
2017 – Cameron Munster & Brodie Croft

Other Awards

Rugby League Players Association

 2006 Best Back – Greg Inglis
 2006 Men's Academic Player of the Year – Matt Geyer
 2013 Men's Academic Player of the Year – Bryan Norrie
 2014 NYC Academic Player of the Year (Education) – Christian Welch
 2017 NYC Player of the Year – Harry Grant
 2015 Rookie of the Year – Cameron Munster
 2017 The Players' 13 Dream Team – Cameron Smith
 2018 The Players' 13 Dream Team – Cameron Munster & Nelson Asofa-Solomona
 2019 The Players' 13 Dream Team – Cameron Munster, Cameron Smith & Kenny Bromwich
 2020 The Players' 13 Dream Team – Cameron Smith
 2021 The Players' 13 Dream Team – Justin Olam & Brandon Smith
 2022 The Players' 13 Dream Team – Justin Olam & Cameron Munster

Sprit of ANZAC Medal
Awarded to the Michael Moore Trophy Player of the ANZAC Day Match against the New Zealand Warriors.
2009 – Adam Blair
2010 – Cooper Cronk
2012 – Kevin Proctor
2013 – Ryan Hoffman
2016 – Tohu Harris
2017 – Nelson Asofa-Solomona
2018 – Billy Slater
2019 – Cameron Smith
2021 – Jahrome Hughes
2022 – Ryan Papenhuyzen

National Youth Competition

Jack Gibson Medal
Awarded to National Youth Competition Grand Final Player of the Match
2009 – Luke Kelly

NRL Under-20s Player of the Year
2017 – Harry Grant

Melbourne Storm Pre-Season

I Don't Quit Iron Bar
Awarded to the best newly recruited player during pre-season boot camp and nominated by military facilitators.

2009 – Ryan Hinchcliffe
2010 –
2011 –
2012 –
2013 – Matt Duffie 
2014 –
2015 – Dale Finucane
2017 – Brandon Smith
2018 – Tom Eisenhuth
2019 – Aaron Booth
2021 – Josh King
2022 – Tyran Wishart

Melbourne Storm Player of the Year Awards
The below awards are all handed out at the annual Melbourne Storm Player of the Year Awards night held at the conclusion of the NRL season.

Cameron Smith Player of the Year
Award renamed "Cameron Smith Player of the Year Award" as of 2022 Melbourne Storm Awards Night.
1998 – Robbie Kearns
1999 – Brett Kimmorley
2000 – Rodney Howe
2001 – Richard Swain
2002 – Rodney Howe (2nd)
2003 – Robbie Kearns (2nd)
2004 – Matt Orford
2005 – Cameron Smith
2006 – Cameron Smith (2nd)
2007 – Cameron Smith (3rd)
2008 – Billy Slater
2009 – Billy Slater (2nd)
2010 – Ryan Hinchcliffe
2011 – Cameron Smith (4th)
2012 – Cameron Smith (5th)
2013 – Cameron Smith (6th)
2014 – Jesse Bromwich
2015 – Jesse Bromwich (2nd)
2016 – Jesse Bromwich (3rd)
2017 – Cameron Smith (7th)
2018 – Cameron Munster
2019 – Dale Finucane
2020 – Cameron Smith (8th)
2021 – Jahrome Hughes

2022 – Cameron Munster (2nd)

Members' Player of the Year
2007 – Billy Slater
2008 – Billy Slater
2009 – Billy Slater 
2010 – Cooper Cronk
2011 – Cooper Cronk
2012 – Ryan Hoffman
2013 – Cameron Smith
2014 – Cooper Cronk
2015 – Cooper Cronk & Jesse Bromwich
2016 – Cameron Smith 
2017 – Cameron Smith 
2018 – Cameron Munster
2019 – Cameron Smith
2020 – Ryan Papenhuyzen
2021 – Jahrome Hughes
2022 – Cameron Munster

Billy Slater Rookie of the Year
Award renamed "Billy Slater Rookie of the Year Award" as of 2018 Melbourne Storm Awards Night.
1998 – Ben Roarty
1999 – Matt Rua
2000 – Tasesa Lavea
2001 – Steven Bell
2002 – Michael Russo
2003 – Cameron Smith
2004 – Matt King
2005 – Brett White
2006 – Adam Blair
2007 – Israel Folau
2008 – Aiden Tolman
2009 – Kevin Proctor
2010 – Matt Duffie
2011 – Gareth Widdop & Jesse Bromwich
2012 – Mahe Fonua
2013 – Tohu Harris
2014 – Kurt Mann
2015 – Cameron Munster
2016 – Suliasi Vunivalu
2017 – Curtis Scott
2018 – Brandon Smith
2019 – Ryan Papenhuyzen
2020 – Tino Fa'asuamaleaui
2021 – Dean Ieremia
2022 – Tyran Wishart

Most Improved Player of the Year
2005 – Jake Webster
2006 – Cooper Cronk
2007 – Jeff Lima
2008 – Sika Manu
2009 – Aiden Tolman
2010 – Dane Neilsen
2011 – Kevin Proctor 
2012 – Sisa Waqa 
2013 – Kenny Bromwich
2014 – Jordan McLean
2015 – Tim Glasby
2016 – Cameron Munster 
2017 – Felise Kaufusi 
2018 – Christian Welch
2019 – Tui Kamikamica
2020 – Justin Olam
2021 – Nicho Hynes
2022 – Marion Seve

Back of the Year
2005 – Matt King
2006 – Greg Inglis
2007 – Billy Slater
2008 – Cooper Cronk
2009 – Greg Inglis 
2010 – Cooper Cronk
2011 – Billy Slater
2012 – Cooper Cronk 
2013 – Cooper Cronk
2014 – Cooper Cronk
2015 – Cameron Munster
2016 – Cooper Cronk 
2017 – Will Chambers 
2018 – Billy Slater
2019 – Jahrome Hughes
2020 – Ryan Papenhuyzen
2021 – Ryan Papenhuyzen
2022 – Ryan Papenhuyzen & Nick Meaney

Forward of the Year
2005 – Dallas Johnson
2006 – Ryan Hoffman
2007 – Dallas Johnson
2008 – Jeff Lima
2009 – Cameron Smith 
2010 – Cameron Smith
2011 – Ryan Hinchcliffe
2012 – Ryan Hoffman
2013 – Jesse Bromwich
2014 – Cameron Smith
2015 – Cameron Smith
2016 – Cameron Smith 
2017 – Jesse Bromwich 
2018 – Dale Finucane
2019 – Cameron Smith
2020 – Brandon Smith
2021 – Brandon Smith
2022 – Harry Grant

Cooper Cronk Feeder Player of the Year
Award renamed "Cooper Cronk Feeder Player of the Year Award" as of 2017 Melbourne Storm Awards Night.
2010 – Jesse Bromwich
2016 – Joe Stimson 
2017 – Brodie Croft 
2018 – Scott Drinkwater
2019 – Harry Grant
2020 – Isaac Lumelume
2021 – Marion Seve
2022 – Sua Fa'alogo

Darren Bell U20’s Player of the Year
Award renamed "Darren Bell Under 20’s Player of the Year Award" after the death of the Melbourne Storm Recruitment Scout in 2011. 
2008 – Louis Fanene 
2009 – Gareth Widdop 
2010 – Tohu Harris 
2011 – Slade Griffin
2012 – Young Tonumaipea
2013 – Pride Petterson-Robati
2014 – Nelson Asofa-Solomona
2015 – Latrell Robinson
2016 – Louis Geraghty 
2017 – Harry Grant 
2018 – Trent Toelau
2019 – Trent Toelau
2021 – Antonio Sanele
2022 – Cole Geyer

Greg Brentnall Young Achievers Award
Award named after chairman of Victoria Rugby League, Greg Brentnall and presented to the most outstanding under 18 year old.
2009 – Lucas Grech 
2010 – Richard Kennar 
2011 – Mahe Fonua
2012 – Young Tonumaipea
2013 – Brandon Manasei
2014 – Charnze Nicoll-Klokstad
2015 – Aaron Teroi
2016 – Ben Nakubuwai 
2017 – Jordin Leiu 
2018 – Haele Finau
2019 – 
2021 – Jay Natapu
2022 – Jared Nauma

Best Try of the Year
2014 – Young Tonumaipea Round 6 vs St George Illawarra
2015 – Marika Koroibete Round 19 vs Penrith
2017 – Kenny Bromwich Qualifying Final vs Parramatta
2018 – Josh Addo-Carr Round 8 vs New Zealand
2019 – Josh Addo-Carr Semi Final vs Parramatta
2020 – Ryan Papenhuyzen Round 12 vs Newcastle
2021 – George Jennings Round 18 vs Newcastle
2022 – Ryan Papenhuyzen Round 7 vs New Zealand

Stadium records
For consistency due to continual sponsorship changes over time, stadiums are listed as their official or most well known name

Primary Home Grounds used by the Storm

Secondary Home Grounds used by the Storm

Attendances
NOTE: From 2016–18 Melbourne Storm played one "home" fixture per year at Suncorp Stadium in Brisbane as part of a Double Header. These statistics have not been included on this table below as the Suncorp Stadium capacity is significantly higher than home venues in Melbourne and crowd numbers are distorted due to the games being double headers because it is not known how much of the crowd is there for the Storm games and how many are there for the other featured game.

Top 5 Home Attendances (Regular Season) - Home Games played in Melbourne

Top 5 Home Attendances (Finals)

Uniform sponsors and manufacturers

Notes

References

National Rugby League lists
Records
Melbourne sport-related lists
Australian records
Rugby league records and statistics